Cyril Suk and Larisa Neiland were the defending champions but lost in the third round to Grant Connell and Robin White.

Mark Woodforde and Martina Navratilova defeated Tom Nijssen and Manon Bollegraf in the final, 6–3, 6–4 to win the mixed doubles tennis title at the 1993 Wimbledon Championships.

Seeds

  Todd Woodbridge /  Arantxa Sánchez Vicario (semifinals)
  Mark Kratzmann /  Natasha Zvereva (semifinals)
  Mark Woodforde /  Martina Navratilova  (champions)
  Danie Visser /  Gigi Fernández (withdrew)
  Rick Leach /  Zina Garrison-Jackson (third round)
  Cyril Suk /  Larisa Neiland (third round)
  Patrick Galbraith /  Kathy Rinaldi (quarterfinals)
  John Fitzgerald /  Elizabeth Smylie (third round)
  Steve DeVries /  Patty Fendick (first round)
  Glenn Michibata /  Jill Hetherington (third round)
  Grant Connell /  Robin White (quarterfinals)
  Tom Nijssen /  Manon Bollegraf (final)
  Greg Van Emburgh /  Helena Suková (first round)
  Luke Jensen /  Meredith McGrath (third round)
  Murphy Jensen /  Brenda Schultz (first round)
  Stefan Kruger /  Amanda Coetzer (third round)

Draw

Finals

Top half

Section 1

Section 2

Bottom half

Section 3

Section 4

References

External links

1993 Wimbledon Championships on WTAtennis.com
1993 Wimbledon Championships – Doubles draws and results at the International Tennis Federation

X=Mixed Doubles
Wimbledon Championship by year – Mixed doubles
Wimbledon Championships